Saibai Island Airport  is an airport on Saibai Island, Queensland, Australia.

Airlines and destinations

See also
 List of airports in Queensland

References

Airports in Queensland
Torres Strait Islands communities